Bosman (Bosmun, Bosngun) is a Ramu language of Papua New Guinea. It is spoken five villages of Dongan ward, Yawar Rural LLG, Madang Province.

Like Watam, it shares a number of irregular plural markers with the Lower Sepik languages, supporting the proposal of a Ramu – Lower Sepik language family.

References

External links
 Rosetta Project: Bosmun Swadesh List

Ottilien languages
Languages of Madang Province
Languages of East Sepik Province